Highland Village is a neighborhood in Houston, Texas, United States.

Highland Village is located inside the 610 Loop in the triangle formed by Greenway Plaza, Uptown, and River Oaks. Highland Village is in the 77027 ZIP code.

The first homes in Highland Village were built in the early 1950s; some of the older homes were torn down and replaced with larger homes in the 2000s.

Nearby Houston neighborhoods include Afton Oaks, Upper Kirby, Lynn Park, Oak Estates, River Oaks, and Weslayan Plaza. The city of West University Place is also close to Highland Village.

Stores in the area include Highland Village Shopping Center, H-E-B's Central Market and Rice Epicurean supermarkets. Shopping in Uptown and the Upper Kirby districts are nearby.

Shopping center
Tootsie's used to occupy space in the shopping center. As of September 7, 2011, Calypso is leasing some of the former Tootsie's space.

Education

Primary and secondary schools

Public schools 
Highland Village is served by Houston ISD schools.

Highland Village is zoned to:
 St. George Place Elementary School
 Lanier Middle School
 Lamar High School

Gallery of public schools

Private schools
Nearby private schools include The Kinkaid School and St. John's School.

Police service
The neighborhood is within the Houston Police Department's Central Patrol Division .

Media
The Houston Chronicle is the area regional newspaper.

The River Oaks Examiner is a local newspaper distributed in the community .

References

External links 

 Afton Oaks 
 Central Market
 Greenway Plaza
 Highland Village Shopping Center

Neighborhoods in Houston